Franziska Goltz (born 19 February 1985 in Schwerin) is a German sports sailor. At the 2012 Summer Olympics, she competed in the Women's Laser Radial class, finishing in 26th place.

References

External links 
 
 
 

1985 births
Living people
Sportspeople from Schwerin
People from Bezirk Schwerin
German female sailors (sport)
Olympic sailors of Germany
Sailors at the 2012 Summer Olympics – Laser Radial
20th-century German women